Dan-Olof Bertil Stenlund (born 25 October 1937 in Skellefteå) is a Swedish university professor and choir conductor.

Life and work 
Dan-Olof Stenlund, was born in 1937 in Skellefteå, the son of the cantor Bertil Stenlund and his wife Esther Vikström. He studied at the Royal Swedish Academy of Music in Stockholm, piano, organ, cello and vocals and graduated as a church musician, accompanist and music educator, followed by studies in conducting with Eric Ericson, Leonard Bernstein and Sergiu Celibidache.

Stenlund took the position of professor of choral conducting at the Royal Danish Academy of Music in Copenhagen at the age of 36 years. He is also a teacher of choral conducting at the Music Academy in Malmö, and a member of the Royal Academy of Music. From 1961 to 1974 he was active as a church musician at Engelbrekt Church in Stockholm.

As an internationally sought-after conductor and choirmaster taught Dan-Olof Stenlund at the State Academy of Music in Malmö and directs the local Chamber Choir, the Malmö Chamber Choir, also the Landesjugendchor of Baden-Württemberg, where he repeatedly seeks dialogue with students and supports talented young musicians.

Awards 
 1977: Norrby Medal
 1995: Choirmaster of the Year

Conducting activities 

 KFUM: Chamber Choir 1957-1974
 Sangesgruppe Spiralerna 1961-1965
 Uppsala Academic Chamber Choir 1961-1974
 KFUM Choir in Stockholm 1965-1974
 Malmö Chamber Choir 1975 -
 Malmö Symfonieorchester Choir 1975-1993

External links 
 
 Dan-Olof Stenlund at Discogs
 
 Malmö Kammarkör (Swedish)
 Landesjugendchor Baden-Württemberg

References 

1937 births
Living people
Contemporary classical music in Sweden
Royal College of Music, Stockholm alumni
Male conductors (music)
20th-century conductors (music)
Swedish choral conductors
21st-century conductors (music)
20th-century Swedish male musicians
21st-century Swedish male musicians